Michael Rudger Gerardus Bernardt (born 19 March 1993) is a South African professional rugby union player, who most recently played with the . His regular position is centre, but he can also play as a fly-half or winger.

Career

Youth rugby

Bernardt was born in Cape Town, South Africa.

He played for the  side in the 2012 Under-19 Provincial Championship, contributing one try in their match against former side .

NMMU Madibaz

In 2014, Bernardt moved to Port Elizabeth to join Varsity Cup side . He made a big impact in the 2014 Varsity Cup competition, scoring four tries (the most of any NMMU backline player) to help his side reach the semi-finals of the competition for the second successive season.

Eastern Province Kings

He also played in their final match of the campaign (for the first twenty minutes of the match before injury resulted in him coming off), which saw them beat the previously-unbeaten  27–11 in Durban; this wasn't enough to help the Kings into the quarter-finals, finishing in fifth spot in the Southern Section.

He was one of 50 players named in the EP Kings' training squad prior to the 2015 season.

References

South African rugby union players
Living people
1993 births
Rugby union players from Cape Town
Rugby union centres
Rugby union wings
Eastern Province Elephants players